Public Trial (Spanish: Audiencia pública) is a 1946 Spanish drama film directed by Florián Rey and starring Paola Barbara.

The film's sets were designed by the art director Francisco Canet.

Cast

References

Bibliography 
 Labanyi, Jo & Pavlović, Tatjana. A Companion to Spanish Cinema. John Wiley & Sons, 2012.

External links 
 

1946 drama films
Spanish drama films
1946 films
1940s Spanish-language films
Films directed by Florián Rey
Spanish black-and-white films
1940s Spanish films